Alexei Arbuzov may refer to:

 Aleksei Arbuzov (1908–1986), Soviet playwright
 Alexei Arbuzov (general) (1792–1861), Imperial Russian general